Nový Přerov is a municipality and village in Břeclav District in the South Moravian Region of the Czech Republic. It has about 300 inhabitants.

Demography
Nový Přerov is one of South Moravian villages with historical Moravian Croat population.

References

Villages in Břeclav District
Croatian communities in the Czech Republic